Dominique Manotti (born Marie-Noëlle Thibault December 23, 1942 in Paris) is a French crime writer and economic historian. She has written more than a dozen books, many of which have been translated. Among her many prizes is the 2011 Grand Prix de Littérature Policière, the most prestigious award in French crime fiction.

Manotti lives in Paris where she is a professor of 19th-century economic history.

Novels
 1995: Sombre Sentier, published in English as Rough Trade, translated by Margaret Crosland and Elfreda Powell; Arcadia Books (London) in 2001
 1997: À nos chevaux!, published in English as Dead Horsemeat, translated by Amanda Hopkinson and Ros Schwartz; Arcadia Books (London), 2007
 1998: Kop;
 2001: Nos fantastiques années fric, published in English as Affairs of State, translated by Amanda Hopkinson and Ros Schwartz, Arcadia Books (London), 2010
 2004: Le Corps noir;
 2006: Lorraine Connection, published in English under the same title, translated by Amanda Hopkinson and Ros Schwartz; Arcadia Books (London), 2008. - Winner of the CWA International Dagger
 2010: Bien connu des services de police;
 2011: L'Honorable Société;
 2013: L'Évasion, published in English as Escape, translated by Ros Schwartz and Amanda Hopkinson, 2014
 2013: Le Rêve de Madoff;
 2015: Or noir;
 2018: Racket

References

Writers from Paris
1942 births
Living people
20th-century French novelists
21st-century French novelists
French women novelists
20th-century French women writers
21st-century French women writers